Phil Williams may refer to:
 Phil Williams (Welsh politician) (1939–2003), Welsh space scientist & Plaid Cymru politician
 Phil Williams (Alabama representative), American politician, member of the Alabama House of Representatives
 Phil Williams (Alabama senator) (born 1965), American politician, member of the Alabama Senate
 Phil Williams (baseball), American baseball player
 Phil Williams (presenter) (born 1974), British radio news reporter and presenter
 Phil Williams (boxer) (born 1977), American super middleweight professional boxer
 Phil Williams (footballer, born 1958), English football player for Chester City
 Phil Williams (footballer, born 1963), Welsh football player
 Phil Williams (priest) (born 1964), Archdeacon of Nottingham

See also
 Philip Williams (disambiguation)